Micromonospora citrea is an endophytic actinomycete. It produces citreamicins, several types of antibacterial antibiotics.

References

Further reading

External links

LPSN
Type strain of Micromonospora citrea at BacDive -  the Bacterial Diversity Metadatabase

Micromonosporaceae
Bacteria described in 2005